Elizabeth 'Liz' L. Thomson (born 1960 or 1961) is an American politician and a Democratic member of the New Mexico House of Representatives representing District 24 since January 15, 2013.

Early life and education
Thomson graduated from the University of New Mexico with a B.S. degree in physical therapy.

Career

Physical therapy
Thomson's career has been spent as a pediatric physical therapist. In addition to her clinical work, she has served on the board of directors of the New Mexico chapter of the American Physical Therapy Association.

New Mexico Legislature
In 2012 Thomson ran for the New Mexico House of Representatives district 24 seat held by Republican representative Conrad James, beating the incumbent by less than 300 votes. She has announced her intention to seek reelection in 2014, in what will likely be a replay of the 2012 race against James.

Political views

Public health
Thomson introduced legislation to establish the New Mexico Fall Prevention Task Force.  The goal of the task force is to prevent older adult falls. (In New Mexico, falls are the leading cause of injury-related deaths, hospitalizations, and emergency department visits among older adults.)  The program includes an awareness campaign about modifiable fall risk factors as well as an increase in availability of fall prevention classes around the state. It was enacted by the legislature and signed into law in 2014.

Animal Welfare
Thomson has been a strong opponent of horse slaughter. In the legislature, Thomson sponsored House Bill 121 which would have banned the use of horses as a foodsource, and House Bill 120 which would have required horses be husbanded according to state regulations for livestock. Neither measure passed out of committee. Thomson also voted for a bill that would prohibit the use of performance-enhancing drugs by racehorses.

Personal life
Thomson is married and has two children.

References

External links
 Official page at the New Mexico Legislature
 
 Elizabeth L. Thomson at Ballotpedia

Place of birth missing (living people)
1960s births
Living people
Democratic Party members of the New Mexico House of Representatives
Politicians from Albuquerque, New Mexico
University of New Mexico alumni
Women state legislators in New Mexico
21st-century American politicians
21st-century American women politicians